Gidleigh Park is a hotel and restaurant located in Gidleigh, near Chagford, Devon, England. Chris Eden joined as Executive Head Chef in September 2019, following 12 years as Head Chef at Driftwood in Portscatho, Cornwall, which has held a Michelin star from 2012 to 2019. The hotel belongs to Andrew Brownsword Hotels which was named AA Hotel Group of the Year 2017–18.

Description

Paul and Kay Henderson bought the hotel and restaurant in 1978. The building is a Tudor–style country house set in 107 acres of gardens and woodlands. In 2005, it was bought by entrepreneur Andrew Brownsword who completed a renovation during 2007, refitting both the restaurant and the hotel, adding another ten bedrooms.

Michael Caines took over as head chef of the restaurant in 1994 and held the reins for 21 years before leaving in early 2016 to pursue his own business ventures elsewhere. As of 2009, Caines was the Executive Head Chef, as he oversaw several other interests while Ian Webber remained on site as head chef.

Michael Wignall joined as Executive Head Chef in January 2016 after spending 8 years at The Latymer at Pennyhill Park Hotel. In early 2018, Wignall left Gidleigh Park to pursue his own ventures. In January 2018, Chris Simpson took over as Executive Head Chef for 12 months after holding his position as Head Chef at Restaurant Nathan Outlaw for seven years.

Reception
Susan D'Arcy of Times Online reviewed the hotel and restaurant in February 2007. It described the restaurant as offering "some of the best dining in the UK". The food received a score of nine out of ten.

In 2009, the hotel won the "Hotel of the Year award" in the Enjoy England Awards for Excellence. It was the first year that the small and large hotel categories had been absorbed into a single category based on quality. In 2010, it was named as the best restaurant in Britain in the first ever Sunday Times Food List, beating The Fat Duck into second place, and Marcus Wareing at the Berkeley into third.

In 2013, the restaurant won Harden's Sunday Times Restaurant of the Year, along with Wine List of the year and came second for Best Service of the Year

The restaurant has lost its Michelin star in 2019.

See also
 Jesse Dunford Wood, a notable chef trained at Gidleigh Park

References

External links
 Gidleigh Park's chef Michael Caines interview

Restaurants in Devon
Tourist attractions in Devon